Budadiri is a town in the Eastern Region of Uganda. It is one of the urban centers in Sironko District.

Location
The geographical coordinates of the town are:01°10'17.0"N, 34°20'06.0"E (Latitude:1.171389; Longitude:34.335000).

Overview
Budadiri is located within Mount Elgon National Park, at the foothills of Mount Elgon. The town is a popular staging area and base camp for climbers who would like to scale the mountain. Budadiri was awarded Municipality status on 1 July 2009.

The town is served by Budadiri Health Centre IV, a medical facility operated by the Ugandan Ministry of Health in conjunction with the  Sironko District Local Government. In 2015, Sarah Achieng Opendi, the then State Minister in Charge of Primary Health Care, ordered the immediate transfer of all 48 health workers from Budadiri Health Center IV in Sironko District. The decision followed citizens' complaints against the health workers for theft of government drugs, chronic absenteeism and poor service delivery.

Challenges
The area around Budadiri town is prone of landslides, especially during the rainy season. The terrain is very steep on the slopes of the mountain. On more than one occasion, landslides have killed people and caused loss and damage of property in the Budadiri area and in other parts of Sironko District.

See also
Bugisu sub-region
Bagisu

References

External links
  FDC Leaders Demand Removal of Landslide Victims from Schools As At 5 January 2020.

Sironko District
Populated places in Eastern Region, Uganda
Bugisu sub-region